Mount Florence Station, often referred to as Mount Florence, is a pastoral lease that once operated as a sheep station but now operates as a cattle station.

It is located about  West Southwest of Marble Bar and  Southwest of Port Hedland and 157 km Southeast of Karratha in the Pilbara region of Western Australia. 

The station was established in 1882 by W.A. and W.E. Robinson, who selected  of land just north of Mount Margaret in the Hamersley Range. The property is named because it was on a long flat hill and from the initials of the younger Robinson's fiancee, MF (Mary Francis).

The homestead was built in the 1890s. The oldest block in the complex was demolished owing to extensive termite damage. The homestead is a group of buildings arranged about a forecourt and set on different levels as they ascend the lower slope of the high hill to the south east.

In 1903 the property was acquired by John Church, who later was elected as the member for Roebourne. It remained in his possession until his death in 1937. The property also had a six-room homestead, electric lights, septic tanks, kitchen, storerooms, various quarters, blacksmith shop and hay sheds. It was purchased by a South Australian pastoralist Richard Andrews. The Andrews family still owned the property in 2016.

See also
List of ranches and stations
List of pastoral leases in Western Australia

References

Pastoral leases in Western Australia
Stations (Australian agriculture)
Pilbara